Sebastiania pubescens is a species of flowering plant in the family Euphorbiaceae. It is native to Minas Gerais, Brazil.

History
It was described in 1912.

References

Plants described in 1912
Flora of Brazil
pubescens